The Academy of Economic Studies of Moldova (ASEM; Romanian: Academia de Studii Economice a Moldovei) is a university located in Chișinău, Moldova.

Organization
The university is organized into six faculties:

 Business Management and Administration
 Economics and Law
 International Economic Relations
 Finance
 Accounting
 Economic Cybernetics, Statistics and Informatics

See also
 List of universities in Moldova
 Education in Moldova

References

External links
Official website 

Academy of Economic Studies of Moldova
Education in Chișinău
Recipients of the Order of Honour (Moldova)
Educational institutions established in 1991
1991 establishments in Moldova